Proto-Hmong–Mien is the reconstructed ancestor of the Hmong–Mien languages. Lower-level reconstructions include Proto-Hmongic and Proto-Mienic.

The date of proto-Hmong-Mien has been estimated to be about 2500 BP by Sagart, Blench, and Sanchez-Mazas (2004), as well as by Ratliff (2021:247). It has been estimated to about 4243 BP by the Automated Similarity Judgment Program (ASJP), however, ASJP is not widely accepted among historical linguists as an adequate method to establish or evaluate relationships between language families.

Reconstructions
Reconstructions of Proto-Hmong–Mien include those of Purnell (1970), Wang & Mao (1995), Ratliff (2010), and Chen (2013), and Ostapirat (2016). Proto-Hmongic (Proto-Miao) has also been reconstructed by Wang (1994), while Proto-Mienic (Proto-Mjuenic; reconstruction excludes Biao Min and Zao Min) has been reconstructed by Luang-Thongkum (1993).

Ratliff (2010)
Martha Ratliff (2010) used 11 criterion languages for her reconstruction.

East Hmongic (Qiandong); Northern vernacular: Yanghao 养蒿, Yanghao Township, Taijiang County, Guizhou
North Hmongic (Xiangxi); Western vernacular: Jiwei 吉卫, Jiwei Township, Huayuan County, Hunan
West Hmongic (Chuanqiandian): White Hmong of Laos and Thailand
West Hmongic (Chuanqiandian); Mashan subdialect, Central vernacular: Zongdi 宗地, Zongdi Township, Ziyun County, Guizhou
West Hmongic (Chuanqiandian); Luopohe subdialect: Fuyuan 复员, Fuyuan County, Yunnan
Hmongic; Jiongnai: Changdong Township 长垌, Jinxiu County, Guangxi
Hmongic; Baiyun Pa-Hng: Baiyun 白云, Rongshui County, Guangxi
Mienic; Mien, Luoxiang vernacular:  Luoxiang Township 罗香, Jinxiu County, Guangxi
Mienic; Mun: Lanjin Township 览金, Lingyun County, Guangxi
Mienic; Biao Min: Dongshan Yao Township 东山, Quanzhou County, Guangxi
Mienic; Zao Min: Daping Township 大平, Liannan County, Guangdong

Wang & Mao (1995) 
Wang & Mao (1995) base their Proto-Hmong–Mien reconstruction from the following 23 criterion Hmong-Mien languages.

 Yanghao 养蒿; Hmu, North (ISO 693-3: [hea])
 Jiwei 吉卫; Qo Xiong, West [mmr]
Xianjin 先进 ( = Dananshan 大南山); Chuanqiandian Miao, 1st lect [cqd]
 Shimenkan 石门坎; Diandongbei Miao [hmd]
 Qingyan 青岩; Guiyang Miao, North [huj]
 Gaopo 高坡; Huishui Miao, North [hmi]
 Zongdi 宗地; Mashan Miao, Central [hmm]
 Fuyuan 复员; Luopohe Miao, 2nd lect [hml]
 Fengxiang 枫香; Chong'anjiang Miao [hmj]
 Qibainong 七百弄; Bunu, Dongnu [bwx]
 Yaoli 瑶里; Nao Klao, Baonuo [bwx]
 Wenjie 文界; Pa-Hng, Sanjiang [pha]
 Changdong 长峒; Jiongnai [pnu]
 Duozhu 多祝; She [shx]
 Jiangdi 江底; Iu Mien, Guangdian [ium]
 Xiangjiang 湘江; Iu Mien, Xiangnan [ium]
 Luoxiang 罗香; Luoxiang Mien  Ao Biao [ium]
 Changping 长坪; Changping Mien a.k.a. Biao Mon [ium]
 Liangzi 梁子; Kim Mun [mji]
 Lanjin 览金; Kim Mun [mji]
 Dongshan 东山; Biao Mon, Dongshan [bmt]
 Sanjiang 三江; Biao Mon, Shikou a.k.a. Chao Kong Meng  [bmt]
 Daping 大坪; Dzao Min [bpn]

Phonology

Ratliff (2010)
Martha Ratliff's 2010 reconstruction contains the following phonemic inventory.

51–54 consonants (including pre-glottalized and pre-nasalized consonants)
9 monophthong vowels
7 diphthongs
11 nasal rimes

The full set of Proto-Hmong–Mien initial consonants is (Ratliff 2010: 31):

The 3 medial consonants are *-j-, *-l-, and *-r-.
The 6 final stop consonants are *-p, *-t, *-k, *-m, *-n, and *-ŋ.

The Proto-Hmong–Mien vowels are (11 total) (Ratliff 2010: 108):

Proto-Hmong–Mien has the following syllable structure (Ratliff 2010:10):

Ratliff does not reconstruct vowel length for either Proto-Mienic or Proto-Hmong–Mien. Even though Mienic languages usually have vowel length, Ratliff ascribes this to areal features that were borrowed after the breakup of Proto-Mienic. Neighboring languages with vowel length include Yue Chinese and Zhuang.

Ostapirat (2016)
Ostapirat (2016) revises various reconstructed Proto-Hmong–Mien consonant initials proposed by Ratliff (2010). He suggests that many proto-initials are in fact sesquisyllables, in line with Baxter & Sagart's (2014) Old Chinese reconstruction and Pittayaporn's (2009) Proto-Tai reconstruction. Examples include reconstructing *m.l- and *m.r- where Ratliff (2010) reconstructs *mbl- and *mbr-, respectively. Hmong-Mien presyllables are further discussed in Strecker (2021).

Ostapirat (2016) also reconstructs velarized initial consonants (*Cˠ-) where Ratliff (2010) reconstructs -j- or -w-.

Additionally, Ostapirat revises Ratliff's uvulars (*q-, etc.) as velars (*k-, etc.), and her palatals as either alveolars or palatals.

Below are some reconstructions from Ostapirat (2016) compared with those of Ratliff (2010).

Vocabulary
Below are some words roughly belonging to the semantic domains of agriculture and subsistence from Ratliff (2004), with the Proto-Hmong-Mien and Proto-Hmongic reconstructions from Ratliff (2010), and Old Chinese reconstructions from Baxter & Sagart (2014) for comparison (note that the Old Chinese forms are not necessarily cognate with the Hmong–Mien forms). Terms for domesticated animals and non-rice crops are usually shared with Chinese, while vocabulary relating to hunting, rice crops, and local plants and animals are usually not shared with Chinese.

The ethnonym Hmong is reconstructed as *hmʉŋA in Proto-Hmongic by Ratliff (2010), while Mien is reconstructed as *mjænA in Proto-Mienic. In comparison, William H. Baxter and Laurent Sagart (2014) reconstruct the Old Chinese name of the Mán 蠻 (Nanman 南蠻, or southern foreigners) as  *mˤro[n]; in comparison, Sidwell & Rau (2015) reconstruct the Proto-Austroasiatic word for 'person' as *mraʔ.

External relationships
The Proto-Hmong–Mien language shares many lexical similarities with neighboring language families, including Austroasiatic, Kra-Dai (Tai-Kadai), Austronesian, and Tibeto-Burman (Ratliff 2010). Martha Ratliff (2010:233-237) lists the following lexical resemblances between Proto-Hmong–Mien (abbreviated below as PHM) and other language families. Proto-Hmongic and Proto-Mienic are provided if the Proto-Hmong–Mien form is not reconstructed.

Austroasiatic
Many lexical resemblances are found between the Hmong-Mien and Austroasiatic language families (Ratliff 2010), some of which had earlier been proposed by Haudricourt (1951). Proto-Austroasiatic (PAA) reconstructions are from Sidwell & Rau (2015).

Lexical resemblances with Austroasiatic
PHM *ʔu̯əm 'water'
PHM *ntshjamX 'blood'; PAA *saːm 'to bleed'
PHM *ntju̯əŋH 'tree'
PHM *ʔɲæmX 'to weep, cry'
PHM *pənX 'to shoot'
PHM *tu̯eiX 'tail'; PAA *sntaʔ
PHM *mpeiH 'to dream'
PHM *ʔpu̯ɛŋX 'full'; PAA *biːŋ; *beːɲ
Proto-Hmongic *mbrɔD 'ant'
Proto-Mienic *səpD 'centipede'
PHM *klup 'grasshopper'
PHM *ntshjeiX 'head louse'; PAA *ciːʔ

Other Austroasiatic parallels listed by Kosaka (2002:94) are:
PHM *tshuŋX 'bone'; PAA *cʔaːŋ
PHM *S-phreiX 'head'
PHM *pji̯əuX 'fruit'
PHM *pjɔu 'three'

Ostapirat (2018:116-117) lists compares the following basic vocabulary items in Hmong-Mien and Austroasiatic. Proto-Palaungic as reconstructed by Sidwell (2015) has also been reconstructed.

Further lexical resemblances between Hmong-Mien and Austroasiatic are listed in Hsiu (2017).

Kra-Dai
Many lexical resemblances are found between the Hmong-Mien and Kra-Dai language families, although the tones often do not correspond (Ratliff 2010). Proto-Tai (abbreviated here as PT) reconstructions are from Pittayaporn (2009). Many of the Proto-Tai forms also have close parallels with Proto-Austronesian.

Lexical resemblances with Kra-Dai
Proto-Hmongic *kɛŋB 'I, 1.'; PT *kuːA (strong form), *kawA (weak form)
PHM *mu̯ei 'thou, 2.'; PT *mɯŋA (strong form), *maɰA (weak form)
PHM *təjH 'to die', *dəjH 'to kill'; PT *p.taːjA 'to die'
PHM *ʔneinX 'this'; PT *najC
PHM *m-nɔk 'bird'; PT *C̬.nokD
PHM *mbrəuX 'fish'; PT *plaːA
Proto-Hmongic *hmaŋC 'wild dog'; PT *ʰmaːA 'dog'
Proto-Hmongic *ʔlinA 'monkey'; PT *liːŋA

Kosaka (2002) lists many lexical resemblances between Kra-Dai and Hmong-Mien languages, and proposes that they form part of a larger Miao-Dai language family.

Austronesian
Many lexical resemblances are found between the Hmong-Mien and Austronesian language families, some of which are also shared with Kra-Dai and Austroasiatic (Ratliff 2010). Proto-Austronesian (abbreviated here as PAN) and Proto-Malayo-Polynesian (abbreviated here as PMP) reconstructions are from Blust (n.d.).

Lexical resemblances with Austronesian and Kra-Dai
Proto-Hmongic *kɛŋB 'I, 1.'; PMP *-ku 'my'
PHM *mu̯ei 'thou, 2.'; PAN *-mu '2nd person'
PHM *mi̯əu 'you (plural), 2.'; PAN *-mu '2nd person'
PHM *təjH 'to die'; PAN *ma-aCay
PHM *dəjH 'to kill'; PAN *pa-aCay
PHM *m-nɔk 'bird'; PMP *manuk

Lexical resemblances with Austronesian and Austroasiatic
PHM *tu̯eiX 'tail'; PMP *buntut
PHM *pu̯ɛŋX 'full'; PMP *penuq
PHM *pənX 'to shoot'; PMP *panaq
PHM *mpeiH 'to dream'; PAN *Sepi, PMP *hi(m)pi

Other lexical resemblances with Austronesian
PHM *mlu̯ɛjH 'soft'; PMP *ma-lumu
PHM *dəp 'bite'; PMP *ketep
PHM *klæŋ 'insect, worm, maggot'; PAN *qulej 'maggot'
PHM *tɛmX 'body louse'; PAN *CumeS, PMP *tumah 'clothes louse'

Tibeto-Burman
Ratliff notes that the Hmong-Mien numerals from 4-9 and various culture-related vocabulary have been borrowed from Tibeto-Burman. The Proto-Tibeto-Burman (abbreviated as PTB) forms provided below are from James Matisoff (2003).

Lexical borrowings from Tibeto-Burman
PHM *plei 'four' < PTB *b-ləy (STEDT #2409)
PHM *prja 'five' < PTB *b-ŋa (STEDT #1306)
PHM *kruk 'six' < PTB *d-k-ruk (STEDT #2621)
PHM *dzjuŋH 'seven'
PHM *jat 'eight' < PTB *b-r-gyat ~ *b-g-ryat (STEDT #2259)
PHM *N-ɟuə 'nine' < PTB *d/s-kəw (STEDT #2364)
Proto-Hmongic *hnɛŋA and Proto-Mienic *hnu̯ɔiA 'sun, day' < PTB *s-nəy (STEDT #85)
PHM *hlaH 'moon, month' < PTB *s-la (STEDT #1016)
PHM *hməŋH 'night' (also 'dark') < PTB *s-muːŋ 'dark' (STEDT #522; #2465)
PHM *ʔɲam 'sister-in-law' (also 'daughter-in-law') < PTB *nam 'daughter-in-law' (STEDT #2486)
PHM *ʔweiX 'son-in-law' < PTB *krwəy (STEDT #2348)
PHM *hlep 'to slice' < PTB *s-lep (STEDT #2401)
PHM *hmjænX 'footprint, track' < PTB *s-naŋ 'to follow' (STEDT #2488)
Proto-Hmongic *mjænB 'horse' < PTB *mraŋ (STEDT #1431)

Additionally, Paul K. Benedict (1987) notes that Proto-Hmong–Mien contains loanwords from an unknown Tibeto-Burman language or branch, which Benedict refers to as Donor Miao-Yao. Benedict (1987:20) believes that these Tibeto-Burman loanwords predate Hmong-Mien's contact with Old Chinese. Some numerals that Benedict (1987) reconstructed for Proto-Donor Miao-Yao are given below.
 *pliA 'four'
 *praA 'five'
 *truk 'six'
 *znis 'seven'
 *hryat 'eight'
 *t-guA 'nine'
 *gup 'ten'

Guillaume Jacques (2021) notes that there are Tibeto-Burman parallels for various Hmong-Mien words that are found specifically in rGyalrongic and neighboring Qiangic languages. These include the words for 'snow' (cf. Jiangdi Mien bwan5), 'scold' (Proto-Hmongic *qe C), 'walnut' (Proto-Hmongic *qlow C), and 'bamboo' (Proto-Hmong-Mien *hləwX).

See also
 Proto-Hmong-Mien reconstructions (Wiktionary)
 Proto-Hmongic reconstructions (Wiktionary)
 Proto-Mienic reconstructions (Wiktionary)
 Hmong-Mien comparative vocabulary list (Wiktionary)

Notes

References

Citations

Sources 

Aumann, Greg; Sidwell, Paul. (2004). "Subgrouping of Mienic Languages: Some Observations". In Papers from the Eleventh Annual Meeting of the Southeast Asian Linguistics Society (pp. 13–27).
 
 Chen Qiguang [陈其光] (2013). Miao and Yao language [苗瑶语文]. Beijing: Ethnic Publishing House [民族出版社]. 
 
 
 
 
 
 Miyake, Marc. 2012. Were there Hmong in the Tangut Empire?
 
  (revision of paper presented at IsCLL-14, Taipei, Taiwan)
 
 
 
  (multiple entries)
Solnit, David B. (1996). "Some evidence from Biao Min on the initials of Proto-Mienic (Yao) and Proto-Hmong-Mien (Miao-Yao)". Linguistics of the Tibeto-Burman Area, 19(1), 1-18.
 Wang Fushi 王辅世, Mao Zongwu 毛宗武. 1995. Miao-Yao yu guyin gouni 苗瑤语古音构拟. Beijing: China Social Sciences Academy Press 中国社会科学出版社.

Hmong–Mien languages
Hmong-Mien